Princess Nakashi (? – after 455) was Empress of Japan as the consort of Emperor Ankō.

Daughter of Emperor Richū and Kusakanohatabino-hime. 

Previously married to Prince Ōkusaka, son of Emperor Nintoku. 

Became a concubine of Emperor Ankō in 454 and was appointed empress 455.

Notes

Japanese empresses
Year of death missing
Japanese princesses
5th-century Japanese women